The term Constable de Bourbon might refer to any of the following Constables of France:
James I, Count of La Marche, constable 1354–1356, killed at the Battle of Brignais
John II, Duke of Bourbon (1426–1488), constable 1483
Charles III, Duke of Bourbon, constable 1518–1523, killed at the Sack of Rome